Wang Bolin (born 9 February 1971) is a Chinese former swimmer who competed in the 1988 Summer Olympics.

References

1971 births
Living people
Chinese female backstroke swimmers
Olympic swimmers of China
Swimmers at the 1988 Summer Olympics
Place of birth missing (living people)